Watching may refer to:

Media 
Watching (TV series), a British television show broadcast from 1987 to 1993
"Watching" (Thompson Twins song), a 1983 Thompson Twins song from the album, Quick Step & Side Kick
"Watching", a song on the 2016 Ty Dolla Sign mixtape, Campaign
Harlan Ellison's Watching, a 1989 compilation of essays and film reviews by Harlan Ellison for Cinema magazine

Perception 
Looking, the act of intentionally focusing visual perception on someone or something
Observation, active acquisition of information
Surveillance, monitoring of behavior, activities, or information
Birdwatching, a hobby in which people observe birds

See also
"Watchin'", a 1998 single by dance band Freemasons
Watch (disambiguation)
Watcher (disambiguation)